Azad is a 1940 social Hindi movie directed by N. R. Acharya and produced by Bombay Talkies.

Cast
 Leela Chitnis
 Ashok Kumar
 Hansa Wadkar
 Mumtaz Ali
 Nazir Bedi
 Rama Shukal
 Nana Palsikar
 D. V. Surve
 Ramchandra Pal

External links

References

Articles containing video clips
1940s Hindi-language films
Films based on works by Saradindu Bandopadhyay